Martial Joseph Armand Herman (29 August 1759, Saint-Pol-sur-Ternoise – 7 May 1795, Paris) (guillotined), was a lawyer and a chief judge during the Reign of Terror. His most famous cases were against Marie Antoinette and Georges Danton. As the commissioner of police he dealt with the Luxembourg prison conspiracies, shortly before the Jacobin regime fell.

Life
Martial was born in a family of lawyers. On 26 July 1783 he was admitted to the bar, and in 1786 he bought the post of substitute attorney general of the provincial Estates of Artois, which seated in Arras.  In 1790 he founded the local club of Jacobins together with his younger brother. In 1791 he was elected criminal court judge in the Pas-de-Calais. In 1792 he married a lower class woman from Willerval, who could not read; the couple had one child. On 28 August 1793, on instigation of Robespierre he replaced Jacques-Bernard-Marie Montané as President of the Revolutionary Tribunal. He presided at the trial of Marie-Antoinette, and the Girondins in October, Philippe Égalité, Madame Roland, and Jean Sylvain Bailly in November, in March/April 1794 Jacques Hébert, Georges Danton and Camille Desmoulins.  On proposal of Lazare Carnot he set up twelve commissions created by the executive decree of 12 Germinal (1 April), to replace the six ministries and their offices, of which he chaired the first (general administration and courts).  He was replaced  by René-François Dumas when he was appointed commissioner of civil administration, police and courts, in succession to Jules-François Paré. Meanwhile Herman lived at 19, Place Vendôme.

Three days after 9 thermidor (30 July 1794), he was arrested and spent ten months in prison. In his first hours of captivity, Herman drafted a supporting memoir. He wrote that he always helped the wives and children of the detainees, etc. On 6 May, receiving the verdict sentencing him to death - with a majority of one vote - he flung his hat out of the window in a moment of rage. It was Scellier who threw a pamphlet at the presiding judge Liger-Verdigny. He was guillotined on the Place de Grève, at about eleven o'clock in the morning, together with Fouquier-Tinville the public prosecutor; Scellier (Vice-Chairman of the Revolutionary Court), Lanne (judge) and Herman's assistant; Foucault (judge); Garnier-Launay (judge); Renaudin (juror); Leroy (juror),  Vilate (juror); Prieur (juror), Chatelet (juror), Girard (juror); Boyaval; Trey; Verney, and Dupaumier. It was Danton's death they wanted to avenge.

References

Sources
 Mémoire Justificatif Pour Le Citoyen Herman - Thermidor An II (1794)
 Boutboul, Julien Un rouage du Gouvernement révolutionnaire : la Commission des administrations civiles, police et tribunaux (germinal an II-brumaire an IV), vol. II (Paris, 2004)
 Landeux, Philippe Le tribunal révolutionnaire de Paris (1793-1795) (2017)

Jacobins
1759 births
1795 deaths
People from Pas-de-Calais
French Foreign Ministers
People of the Reign of Terror
French people executed by guillotine during the French Revolution
French interior ministers
Presidents of the French Revolutionary Tribunal